Rancho Saucos was a  Mexican land grant in present-day Tehama  County, California given in 1844  by Governor Manuel Micheltorena to Robert H. Thomes.  The name means "Ranch of the Elder trees".  The grant extended along the west side of the Sacramento River from Elder Creek and Rancho Las Flores on the north to Thomes Creek on the south, and encompassed present-day Tehama.

History
Robert Hasty Thomes (1817–1878), was born in Cumberland County, Maine and came to California in 1841 with the Bartleson-Bidwell Party.

Thomes and Albert G. Toomes became partners in a carpentry business in Monterey. They  built a house in Monterey for Governor pro tem Manuel Jimeno.   Thomes arrived in the Tehama area in the company of Albert G. Toomes (Rancho Rio de los Molinos), William Chard (Rancho Las Flores), and  Job Francis Dye (Rancho Primer Cañon o Rio de Los Berrendos).  Thomes  five square league grant was directly across the Sacramento River from the five square league Rancho Rio de los Molinos grant  of Toomes.  In 1850, Thomes mapped out on the land grant what would become the city of Tehama. It was the last stop for the riverboats for a few years, and the first county seat. When the boats started going further up the river, Red Bluff became the center of trade and the county seat.

With the cession of California to the United States following the Mexican-American War, the 1848 Treaty of Guadalupe Hidalgo provided that the land grants would be honored.  As required by the Land Act of 1851, a claim for Rancho Saucos was filed with the Public Land Commission in 1852, and the grant was patented to Robert H. Thomes in 1857. 
 
Thomes died in Tehama March 26,1878, unmarried.

References

 

Saucos
Saucos
Sacramento River
Saucos